In mathematics, the Lévy metric is a metric on the space of cumulative distribution functions of one-dimensional random variables. It is a special case of the Lévy–Prokhorov metric, and is named after the French mathematician Paul Lévy.

Definition
Let  be two cumulative distribution functions. Define the Lévy distance between them to be

Intuitively, if between the graphs of F and G one inscribes squares with sides parallel to the coordinate axes (at points of discontinuity of a graph vertical segments are added), then the side-length of the largest such square is equal to L(F, G).

A sequence of cumulative distribution functions  weakly converges to another cumulative distribution function  if and only if .

See also
 Càdlàg
 Lévy–Prokhorov metric
 Wasserstein metric

References
 

Measure theory
Metric geometry
Theory of probability distributions
Paul Lévy (mathematician)